National squads of the 2006 UEFA European Under-21 Championship.
Players in bold have now been capped at full International level.

Group A

Head coach: René Girard

Head coach: Dieter Eilts

Head coach: Agostinho Oliveira

Head coach: Dragomir Okuka

Group B

Head coach: Flemming Serritslev

Head coach: Claudio Gentile

Head coach: Foppe de Haan

Head coach: Oleksiy Mykhaylychenko

Footnotes

Squads
UEFA European Under-21 Championship squads